Royal Naval Air Station Dunino or more simply RNAS Dunino (HMS Jackdaw II) is a former Fleet Air Arm base located  west of Kingsbarns, Fife, Scotland and  south east of St Andrews, Fife.

History

It started life as RAF Dunino, and No. 309 Polish Fighter-Reconnaissance Squadron used the airfield from 8 May 1941 when they re-equipped with the Westland Lysander IIIA then the North American Mustang I during 1942.  The squadron had detachments at RAF Gatwick, RAF Longman and RAF Findo Gask and left on 26 November 1942 going to RAF Findo Gask.

The airfield was then transferred to the Royal Navy and renamed RNAS Dunino (HMS Jackdaw II).

The first squadron was 825 Naval Air Squadron with the Fairey Swordfish between February and March 1943.

Between April 1943 to August 1943, 827 Naval Air Squadron with Fairey Barracudas then between February 1943 and September 1943, 737 Naval Air Squadron with Supermarine Walrus amphibians. Finally between December 1943 and January 1944, 813 Naval Air Squadron with Swordfish torpedo bombers.

See also
 List of air stations of the Royal Navy
 List of former Royal Air Force stations

References

Citations

Bibliography

External links

Royal Air Force stations of World War II in the United Kingdom